Tipton is a small unincorporated community in Monroe County, Illinois, United States. It grew up around the Cambria Station on the St. Louis and Cairo Railroad. The community there, settled by persons of Irish descent was called Tipperary, which degenerated over time through Tiptown, to the current Tipton.

References 

Unincorporated communities in Monroe County, Illinois
Unincorporated communities in Illinois
Metro East
Irish-American history
Irish-American culture in Illinois